Donna Allen (born May 15, 1958) is an American dance-pop singer, born in Key West, Florida, and raised in Tampa. At one point a cheerleader for the Tampa Bay Buccaneers, she got her start performing in the bands Hi-Octane, Trama and Maxx.  During her tenure with MAXX she was courted by Alan Walden (Capricorn Records/Hustler Productions) before launching a solo career. She also sang backup on tour for Gloria Estefan for nine years.

Career
Allen's first disc was the Lou Pace-produced 1986 album, Perfect Timing, and over the next few years she launched several hits on the US Billboard Hot Dance/Club Play chart.

She had two Top 10 hits in the UK Singles Chart with "Serious" (1987, #8) and "Joy and Pain" (1989, #10). 1995's "Real", her last US chart hit, was taken from the soundtrack to the Sylvester Stallone film The Specialist.

The UK dance act Strike used her chorus hook line from "Serious", as the basis for their club hit, "U Sure Do" released in 1994. Allen provided the vocals to Soulsearcher's 2003 dancefloor smash Feelin' Love. "He is the Joy" appeared on the Precious soundtrack (2009).

The Voice
In 2013, she made an attempted comeback by competing in Season 5 of NBC's singing competition, The Voice. On the inaugural day of the season, broadcast on September 23, 2013, she performed Joe Cocker's song "You Are So Beautiful" with two of the four judges, namely Adam Levine and Christina Aguilera, hitting their "I Want You" button and turning their chairs. Allen opted to be in Team Adam for the season. During the Battle Rounds, she was defeated by fellow Team Adam teammate Tessanne Chin, the eventual winner of Season 5.

Discography

Studio albums

Compilation albums
 The Best of Donna Allen (BCM Records, 1993)

Singles

References

External links
Official Website

Singers from Florida
American cheerleaders
The Voice (franchise) contestants
Living people
People from Key West, Florida
Musicians from Tampa, Florida
20th-century American singers
21st-century American singers
National Football League cheerleaders
1958 births